Finley Quaye (born 25 March 1974, Edinburgh, Scotland) is a Scottish musician. He won the 1997 MOBO Award for best reggae act, and the 1998 BRIT Award for Best Male Solo Artist.

Life
Finley Quaye is the son of vaudeville pianist Cab Kaye and the half-brother of the English guitarist Caleb Quaye.

Born in Edinburgh, Quaye went to school in London, Manchester and Edinburgh. However, he left school with no qualifications. Before making records he took employment spraying cars, smoking fish, making futons and as a stage-rigger and scaffolder.

His father was born in London, but considered himself as African. Although known as Cab Kaye, his full name was Nii Lante Augustus Kwamlah Quaye and he was a Chief of the Ga tribe centralized in Jamestown, Accra, Ghana. Kaye was the son of the pianist Caleb Jonas Quaye a.k.a. Mope Desmond, who was born in Accra, Ghana. Finley did not grow up with his father and only found out in his twenties about his father's history as a musician. Mope Desmond, Cab Kaye and Finley Quaye have all played Glasgow's Barrowlands, Wolverhampton's Wulfrun Hall and London's Cafe de Paris. Finley was on tour with his band when he met his father for the first time in Amsterdam.

Finley Quaye was inspired early on in his childhood by jazz musicians Pete King, Ronnie Scott, who started his musical career making tea and running errands in Finley's father's band, and Lionel Hampton. Quaye heard jazz as a child, living in London with his mother, who would take him with her to Ronnie Scott's jazz club to catch performances of American jazz musicians touring Europe such as Buddy Rich, who recorded his live album there in 1980. Quaye's mother had long-term relationships with musician Pete King, who hosted and performed at Ronnie Scott's club in Frith Street, London, as well as Dodi Fayed, a film producer who produced Breaking Glass with Hazel O'Connor.

In April 2012, Quaye was charged with aggravated assault in Edinburgh. He was subsequently found guilty and sentenced to 225 hours of unpaid work. In November of the same year, he was declared bankrupt with a tax debt of £383,000 after HMRC applied to the courts to recover the money. Official documents stated that Quaye had "zero assets". Quaye also admitted possession of cannabis in 2003.

Career
Quaye made a solo recording contract with Polydor Records and moved to New York City. He began working with Epic/Sony when Polydor let him out of contract, and in late 1997 he reached the UK Top 20 twice, with "Sunday Shining" and "Even After All". His reputation was established by Maverick A Strike, released in September 1997. It went gold less than three weeks later, and led directly to the BRIT Award victory. The album is now certified 2× platinum in the UK. In 1998, Quaye performed George Gershwin's "It Ain't Necessarily So" for the Red Hot Organization's compilation album Red Hot + Rhapsody, a tribute to George Gershwin, which raised money for various charities devoted to increasing AIDS awareness and fighting the disease.

Two more albums were released on Epic, Vanguard (2000) and Much More Than Much Love (2004). "Spiritualized" became his last single to score a top 40 landing in the UK chart when it was released in September 2000, reaching number 26. In 2004 the single "Dice" was released in collaboration with William Orbit and featuring Beth Orton. The song featured in Fox Network's The OC and on the season 1 soundtrack, becoming a minor hit.

He released the EP Pound for Pound with Intune Records in 2008, with Norman Grant of the Twinkle Brothers featuring Sly Dunbar and Lloyd Parks. He recorded in 1998 with Buju Banton and Sly Dunbar in Kingston, Jamaica at Penthouse Studios and also recorded with Tricky and Iggy Pop at Sony Music Studios, in Manhattan, New York City.

In July 2015 he was forced off stage mid-performance by the owner of a music club in Gloucestershire who criticised him for lacking professionalism.

Discography

Studio albums

Compilations
The Best of the Epic Years 1995-2003 (2008)

Extended plays
Oranges and Lemons (2005)
Pound For Pound (2008)

Singles

Other collaborations
"Finley's Rainbow" on A Guy Called Gerald's Black Secret Technology (1995)
"Caravan" on Timo Maas' album Loud (2002)
"Stranges Changes" on A Guy Called Gerald's To All Things What They Need (2005)
"We Are Dreamers" on Cathy Claret's album Gypsy Flower (2007)
"After Tonight" on Ava Leigh's La La La (2007)
"Metamorphosis" on Christopher Chaplin's album M (2020)

References

External links
 – official website 

1974 births
Living people
Scottish pop musicians
Black British rock musicians
Brit Award winners
Musicians from Edinburgh
Scottish people of Ghanaian descent
British trip hop musicians
British reggae musicians